Romance is the second album by Chilean metal band Dorso. In this album the band experienced the same elements of the last album that made them famous in the underground scene. Here Rodrigo Cuadra focuses on a conceptual history, taking its best Dorso to Progressive metal, away from the heavy riffs and speed of Thrash metal. Romance for many is considered one of the most creative of Chilean folk music, stand alongside conceptual works as Pichanga of Congress and even heights of Machu Picchu to Los Jaivas, Cuadra groups they admire.

Trama
Romance is about the story of a medieval lord name Reytec which falls for a soul that lives Mater name in medieval mansion. In itself the story moves away from Gore and type Lovecraft stories that flooded the group's creations as much as in the previous recording and rear of Romance.

Track listing
All music and arrangements by Dorso, except where noted.  All lyrics by Rodrigo Cuadra.
 Andante Gore 2:53 (Music: Cuadra)
 Madre de las Tinieblas 9:22
 Proclamación 12:46
 En el Jardín 0:44
 Psicópata Peligroso 8:59
 Reytec 6:19
 Romance 9:26
 Ave Dorsal 2:37 (Music: Cuadra)
 La Ira de la Triada 9:48
 Romance II 9:03
 El Harem 2:42

Personnel
 Rodrigo Cuadra - Vocals, bass and keyboard
 Gamal Eltit - Acoustic and Electric Guitars
 Eduardo Topelberg - drums

1991 albums
Dorso albums